James Albert Garner (18 July 1895 – 9 April 1975) was an English footballer who played as a full-back.

Born in Pendlebury, Lancashire, Garner made five league appearances for Liverpool, and went on to play for Southport and New Brighton. He played in either of the full-back positions.

References

External links
 LFC History profile

1895 births
1975 deaths
Place of death missing
People from Pendlebury
Sportspeople from Lancashire
English footballers
Association football fullbacks
Liverpool F.C. players
Southport F.C. players
New Brighton A.F.C. players